is a song by Japanese singer Sachiko Nishida, released as the double A-side of her second single "Yokubō no Blues" by Polydor Records in August 1961. It is a Japanese-language cover of the Venezuelan song "Moliendo Café".

Background and release
Originally written by José Manzo Perroni, "Moliendo Café" was first adapted in Japanese by Seiji Nakazawa and recorded by Sachiko Nishida in 1961. Nishida performed the song on the 12th NHK Kōhaku Uta Gassen that year.

"Coffee Rumba" was reissued in November 1975; this time with "Yokubō no Blues" as the B-side. The song was re-released as a CD maxi-single by Polydor on March 7, 2001 to celebrate its 40th anniversary.

Track listing

Yōko Oginome version

"Coffee Rumba" was covered by Yōko Oginome (under the pseudonym "YO+CO") as her 25th single, released on May 8, 1992 by Victor Entertainment. The song was used by DyDo Drinco Inc. for their DyDo Blend Coffee commercial. Oginome was not familiar with the song until DyDo Drinco approached her to record it. The single peaked at No. 35 on Oricon's singles chart and sold over 171,000 copies, becoming her last single to sell over six figures. Oginome performed the song on the 43rd NHK Kōhaku Uta Gassen that year.

In the segment, Oginome and the Tunnels (Takaaki Ishibashi and Noritake Kinashi) would dance to the first verse of the song before ending with the line "Let's dance".

Oginome re-recorded the song in her 2014 cover album Dear Pop Singer.

Track listing
All music is arranged by Yukio Sugai, Kōichi Kaminaga, and Ryujin Inoue.

Charts

Yōsui Inoue version

Yōsui Inoue released his version of "Coffee Rumba" on January 24, 2001 as part of his cover album United Cover. The single peaked at No. 19 on Oricon's singles chart.

Track listing

Charts

Other cover versions
 The Peanuts covered the song in 1962, but with different lyrics by Takashi Otowa.
 Antonio Kuga recorded two parody versions of the song: "Kusuri Rumba" (1971) and "Kusuri Rumba Part 2" (1982).
 Yuri Ōsawa and Kurumi Kobato recorded the parody song "Māhjong Furotsuki Osake Rumba" in 1978. Michiyo Sako covered this parody version in 1997.
 Izumi Kobayashi covered the song in 1982 for her album Nuts, Nuts, Nuts; it was later included on the 2019 compilation album Pacific Breeze: Japanese City Pop, AOR and Boogie 1976–1986.
 Yuri Kunizane covered the song in 1991.
 Logic System covered the song on their 1992 album Space Polyphony.
 Gorō Tani and Gorō Shō recorded the parody song "Yasai Rumba" in 1993.
 Kobucha Band recorded the parody song "Kobucha Rumba" in 1999.
 Shizuka Kudo covered the song on her 2002 cover album Shōwa no Kaidan Vol. 1.
 Pink Jam Princess covered the song in 2006.
 Tomiko Van covered the song on her 2007 cover album Voice: Cover You with Love.
 Ai Nishida covered the song on her 2019 cover album Island Songs ~Watashi no Suki na Ai no Uta~.
 Jirō Atsumi covered the song on his 2019 album Shin Enka-shi ~Uta to Guitar to Percussion~.

References

External links
Sachiko Nishida

Yōko Oginome

1961 singles
1961 songs
1992 singles
2001 singles
Yōko Oginome songs
Japanese-language songs
Polydor Records singles
Victor Entertainment singles

ja:コーヒー・ルンバ (YO-COの曲)